The following events occurred in July 1943:

July 1, 1943 (Thursday)
The death sentence, for treason, of German-born American Max Stephan was commuted by U.S. President Roosevelt to life imprisonment, seven hours before Stephan was to be hanged.  Stephan had been convicted of harboring a German prisoner of war who had escaped from a POW camp in Ontario.
The United States Women's Army Corps (WAC) was converted to full status, changing its name from the Women's Auxiliary Army Corps, and U.S. Army Major Oveta Culp Hobby was the first Director.
The Nurse Training Act was passed by the United States Congress, creating the U.S. Cadet Nurse Corps.
Adolf Eichmann was granted full authority by Martin Bormann to use the Gestapo in enforcement of "the permanent elimination of Jews from the territories of Greater Germany".
U.S. forces defeated the Japanese in the Battle of Viru Harbor on the island of New Georgia.
Romanian Foreign Minister Mihai Antonescu met with the Italian dictator Benito Mussolini in Rome and pleaded with him to lead a bid by the countries aligned with Germany to leave the Axis. Mussolini refused to commit to the plan.
An Investigation of Global Policy with the Yamato Race as Nucleus, a six-volume secret report compiled by the Population and Race Section of the Research Bureau of Japan's Ministry of Health and Welfare, was completed and submitted to the Prime Minister, setting the blueprint for imposing Japanese names, the Japanese language and the Shinto religion on all minorities within the Empire.
Tokyo City was administratively merged with its prefecture to form the special wards of Tokyo.

July 2, 1943 (Friday)
New Georgia, the largest of the Solomon Islands controlled by Japan, was invaded by the U.S. 37th and 43rd Infantry divisions, striking from Rendova Island. After fierce resistance from the Japanese occupiers for more than a month, the New Georgia airfield at Munda would  be captured on August 5, and the entire island would be secured by August 25.
Allied forces on New Georgia began the Drive on Munda Point.

July 3, 1943 (Saturday)
The new town of Oak Ridge, Tennessee, constructed for workers on the secret atomic bomb project, had its first residents arrive, as a family moved into a trailer on the 92 square mile area.  Within two years, it would have 75,000 people, but its existence would be kept hidden until after World War II.
The Battle of Wickham Anchorage ended in American victory.
The German submarines U-126 and U-628 were both depth charged and sunk northwest of Cape Ortegal, Spain by British aircraft.
"Comin' in on a Wing and a Prayer" by The Song Spinners topped the Billboard singles chart.
Born: 
Kurtwood Smith, American film and TV actor known for Robocop and That '70s Show;, in New Lisbon, Wisconsin 
Judith Durham, Australian singer (The Seekers); in Essendon, Victoria

July 4, 1943 (Sunday)
Subhas Chandra Bose became the new President of the Indian Independence League, which was meeting in the Cathay Theater in Japanese-occupied Singapore.
The American Forces Radio Network (which became the United States Armed Forces Network) was created to broadcast from 55 low-power transmitters near areas in the United Kingdom where American servicemen were stationed.
The British troopship City of Venice was torpedoed and sunk north of Ténès, Algeria by German submarine U-375.
Born: Geraldo Rivera, American reporter and talk show host; in Brooklyn, New York City
Died: General Władysław Sikorski, 62, Prime Minister of Poland 1922–1923, leader of the Polish government-in-exile after the German conquest of 1939; in the 1943 Gibraltar B-24 crash that killed 14 others, including Brigadier General J. P. Whitehead, a British MP, leading to Władysław Sikorski's death controversy

July 5, 1943 (Monday)
The Battle of Kursk, the largest tank battle in history, began when Germany launched an attack on the Soviet city of Kursk with 20 infantry divisions and 3,000 tanks.  Two days later, the Soviet Union launched a counteroffensive against the Germans.  By the time the battle ended on August 5, the Germans had lost 70,000 men and 2,900 of the 3,000 tanks.
American and Japanese troops fought the Battle of Kula Gulf off Kolombangara in the Solomon Islands.
The American destroyer USS Strong was sunk in Kula Gulf by the Japanese destroyer Niizuki and shore batteries.
The German submarine U-535 was depth charged and sunk northeast of Cape Finisterre, Spain by a B-24 Liberator of No. 53 Squadron RAF.
Film actress Betty Grable was married to bandleader Harry James at a ceremony in Las Vegas.

July 6, 1943 (Tuesday)
The town of Boise City, Oklahoma was mistakenly bombed by a U.S. Army Air Forces plane that had taken off from the nearby Dalhart Army Air Base in Texas.  The pilot, sent on a training mission to drop explosives on a practice range near Conlen, Texas, got off course, mistook Boise City for the range, and dropped five bombs on the town.  Although there was slight damage to buildings, nobody was injured, and the air raid was stopped after the town was blacked out by an alert power plant worker.
The Battle of Kula Gulf was fought between U.S. and Japanese warships off the island of Kolombangara with an inconclusive result. The American cruiser Helena and the Japanese destroyers Nagatsuki and Niizuki were sunk.
Yeshwantrao Holkar II, the 33-year-old Maharaja of Indore, described as "one of the wealthiest men in the world", was granted a divorce from his American wife, the Maharanee Margaret Lawlor, in proceedings in Reno, Nevada.

July 7, 1943 (Wednesday)
Southern Airways was incorporated by Frank Hulse and Ike Jones, in order to seek approval from the Civil Aeronautics Board to operate a civilian airline after the end of World War II.  In later years, the company would merge with another carrier to become Republic Airlines, which would then be acquired by Northwest Airlines, which in turn would be acquired by Delta Air Lines.  
Reverend Jóhannes Gunnarsson became the first Roman Catholic Bishop of Iceland, in services held in Washington, D.C.
Died: Rudolph Forster, 70, Chief Clerk of the White House Executive Offices since 1897.  His obituary described him as "virtually unknown to the public, but for 46 years highly esteemed and frequently honored by the nation's presidents", and he served for eight U.S. Presidents, from William McKinley to Franklin D. Roosevelt.

July 8, 1943 (Thursday)
The Jamaica Labour Party, which rivals the People's National Party and is in opposition in Jamaica as of February 2015, was founded by Alexander Bustamante.
The German submarines U-232 and U-514 were lost to enemy action. 
Born: 
Joel Siegel, American film critic for Good Morning America; in Los Angeles (d. 2007); 
Guido Marzulli, Italian painter, in Bari
Died:  
Sir Harry Oakes, 68, American-born British entrepreneur, who was found beaten to death in his mansion in Nassau in the Bahamas.  The search for Oakes, described once as one of the two wealthiest men in America, was made after he failed to appear for a scheduled golf game with the Duke of Windsor, the former King who had become the British Governor of the Bahamas. The case was never solved, and the murderer of Oakes was never discovered.
Jean Moulin, 44, a leader of the French Resistance against the Nazi German occupation of France, after being tortured by the Nazi Gestapo.
Edward Haight, 17, became the youngest person to ever die in the electric chair in New York, as he was executed for the September murder of two young girls ten months earlier.
Levi Mosley, a seasonal farm laborer, died in a hospital in Norfolk, Virginia. When Mosley failed to report to his local draft board in December, the FBI would be called in and begin a nine-year search for Mosley, which would not end until 1953 when his death was discovered.

July 9, 1943 (Friday)
A German air raid killed 108 people, many of them children, in a movie theater, in the British town of East Grinstead.  Schoolchildren were inside the Whitehall Cinema, watching a Hopalong Cassidy film, when air raid sirens sounded.  At 5:17 pm, a wave of German bombers struck the town, leveling the theater with one bomb, followed by a second.  Another 235 people were seriously injured. 
The United States Congress recessed for the first time in four years, after the nation's legislators had passed on vacations since 1939.
The German submarines U-435 and U-590 were lost to enemy action in the Atlantic Ocean. 
Born: Soledad Miranda, Spanish-born Portuguese actress; in Seville (killed in car wreck, 1970)

July 10, 1943 (Saturday)
The Allied invasion of Sicily began as U.S., British and Canadian forces landed on the large Italian island at 0245 GMT (4:45 am local time), with the U.S. Third Infantry Division, codenamed the "Dime Force", coming ashore at the beaches of the port city of Licata.  The  Seventh United States Army and the British Eighth Army arrived with 180,000 men on 2,590 ships in "the largest sea-borne assault" of World War II.  Defending Sicily were 230,000 Italian and 40,000 German troops.  Earlier, the Allies released 147 military gliders from towing aircraft, to glide in silently.  Of those, 69 were released too early and landed in the ocean, drowning 252 men.  Only 12 of the 147 gliders landed in the target area.
The American destroyer USS Maddox was bombed and sunk off Gela, Sicily by an Italian Junkers Ju 87.
The Battle of Enogai began between U.S. and Japanese forces in New Georgia.
Born: Arthur Ashe, African-American tennis player, winner of titles at U.S. Open (1968), Australian Open (1970) and Wimbledon (1975); in Richmond, Virginia (d. 1993)

July 11, 1943 (Sunday)
The British Army captured the ancient port of Syracuse (Siracusa) in the invasion of Sicily, while nine other major ports (Licata, Gela, Pachino, Avola, Noto, Pozzallo, Scoglitti, Ispica and Rosolini) were captured by the Allies on the second day of the invasion.
The Allied troopships California and Duchess of York of Convoy Faith were bombed in the Atlantic Ocean west of Vigo, Spain by Focke-Wulf Fw 200 Condor aircraft of the Luftwaffe. Both were scuttled the next day after the rescue of survivors.
The Battle of Enogai on New Georgia ended in American victory.
The Italian submarine Flutto was sunk in the Straits of Messina by British motor torpedo boats.
Born: Robert Malval, Prime Minister of Haiti 1993–1994; in Port-au-Prince

July 12, 1943 (Monday)
In the main engagement of the Battle of Prokhorovka, the German SS Panzer-Regiment 1 and the Soviet 5th Guards Tank Army fought a prolonged tank battle that saw the loss of hundreds of tanks in a single day. As many as 429 German and 616 Soviet tanks battled over the next four days, one of the largest tank battles in military history.
An explosion at Eglin Air Force Base in Florida killed 17 men and injured 51 others.
The United States Pharmacy Corps was created. 
The Battle of Kolombangara was fought off the island of Kolombangara over the night of July 12–13, resulting in Japanese tactical victory. The American destroyer Gwin and the Japanese cruiser Jintsū would both be sunk.
The German submarines U-409, U-506 and U-561 were lost to enemy action. 
Born:  
Christine McVie, British rock keyboardist and singer (Fleetwood Mac); in Bouth, Lancashire 
Walter Murch, Academy Award winning U.S. film editor; in New York City
Died: Cecilia Loftus, 66, Scottish-born American vaudevillian

July 13, 1943 (Tuesday)
University of Munich student Alexander Schmorell, 25, and university Professor Karl Huber, 49, were both executed by guillotine at Munich's Stadelheim Prison after being convicted of distributing anti-Nazi literature for the secret organization White Rose.  On the same day, trial was held for four other students who were White Rose defendants— Wilhelm Geyer, Manfred Eickemeyer, Josef Soehngen and Harald Dohrn.  People's Court chief judge Roland Freisler was absent, and the case was tried before the more lenient Judge Schwingenschlögl.  All four were acquitted of the most serious charges and convicted on the less serious crime of failing to report treason. Soehngen received a six-month sentence, with credit for time served, while the other three were ordered to pay court costs.
The German submarines U-487 and U-607 were lost to enemy action in the Atlantic Ocean. 
The American League defeated the National League 5-3 in the 11th Major League Baseball All-Star Game at Shibe Park in Philadelphia.
Died: Luz Long, 30, German track and field athlete and 1936 Olympic silver medalist, died of wounds suffered while fighting against the Allied invasion of Sicily

July 14, 1943 (Wednesday)
Two days after reporting to Soviet Party general secretary Joseph Stalin, General Panteleimon Ponomarenko, the leader of the Belarusian resistance movement, issued Order Number 42, directing the 123 partisan units to begin the destruction of the railway lines that had brought invading German troops in 1941.
The Battle of Mubo in New Guinea ended in Allied victory.
U.S. soldiers carried out the Biscari massacre, killing 73 unarmed German and Italian prisoners of war. 
The German submarine U-160 was sunk in the Atlantic Ocean by U.S. aircraft.
The Japanese submarine I-179 sank in the Seto Inland Sea during a diving drill when a hatch was left open. All hands were lost.
The war drama film For Whom the Bell Tolls based on the Ernest Hemingway novel of the same name and starring Gary Cooper and Ingrid Bergman was released.

July 15, 1943 (Thursday)
Renzo Chierici, the Chief of Police for the Italian-occupied area of France, agreed to a demand by the German authorities to turn over all German Jews who had fled across the border.
The Tule Lake Segregation Center in California was created by order of the U.S. Department of War, renamed from the Tule Lake Relocation Center, one of ten internment camps for U.S. citizens with Japanese ancestry. The "Segregation Center" was selected to house those Japanese-Americans "who by their acts have indicated that their loyalties lie with Japan during the present hostilities". The internees who were classified as disloyal would be transferred to Tule Lake from the other nine camps. Included were any who had formally asked for repatriation to Japan and had not retracted their applications before July 1, 1943; persons who had failed to answer or declined to agree to serve in the U.S. armed forces if called; and any other persons who were, in the opinion of a camp director, not loyal to the United States.
The German submarines U-135, U-509 and U-759 were lost to enemy action.
Born:  
Jocelyn Bell Burnell, U.K. astrophysicist and radio astronomer; in Belfast, Northern Ireland  
The Diligenti quintuplets (Franco, Carlos Alberto, Maria Ester, Maria Fernanda and Maria Cristina); in Buenos Aires, Argentina. They were the second group of quintuplets to all survive childbirth, the Dionne quintuplets having been the first, in 1934. In 2013, all five celebrated their 70th birthday together in Argentina.

July 16, 1943 (Friday)
The Norwegian freighter D/S Bjørkhaug, which was hauling 1,800 German mines that had been collected by minesweepers, exploded in the harbor at Algiers, killing hundreds of people who were working on the docks.  
Allied aircraft dropped pamphlets over the Italian mainland with the message, "Die for Mussolini and Hitler, or live for Italy and for civilization", a message reinforced by Allied radio broadcasts.  On the same day, Benito Mussolini, under pressure from other members of the Fascist Party to respond to the invasion of Italy, convened the Fascist Grand Council for the first time since 1939. 
The Air Ministry of the United Kingdom gave approval for the use of the aluminum strips referred to as "Window", as a countermeasure against German radar. 
Nazi officials in German-occupied France ordered a roundup of the 13,000 Jews living in Paris, including 4,000 children, to be arrested and deported to the detention center at Drancy, from which they were transported to the Auschwitz extermination camp. 
Lithuanian Jewish resistance leader Yitzhak Wittenberg voluntarily surrendered himself to the Gestapo in Vilnius in return for an agreement that the Jewish ghetto there would not be liquidated.  Wittenberg died soon afterward, either being murdered or killing himself.  
Father Marie-Benoit, a French Roman Catholic priest, met with Pope Pius XII in hopes of getting Vatican support for the transfer of 30,000 French Jews, from the Italian occupation zone at Nice, to Italy, before the area was turned over to German administration.  Benoit was unsuccessful in persuading the Pope to act. 
The German Office of High Frequency Research was created, with Dr. Hans Plendl as the director.
The Battle of Mount Tambu began in New Guinea.
The British cruiser Cleopatra was torpedoed in the Mediterranean Sea by the Italian submarine Dandolo. Repairs would take until November 1944 to complete.
The German submarine U-67 was depth charged and sunk in the Atlantic Ocean by U.S. aircraft based on the escort carrier Core.
The Batman brought the comic book superheroes Batman and Robin to film for the first time, in a 15-installment serial that would precede the feature presentation of films from the Columbia Pictures studio. Lewis Wilson, 23, appeared as Batman and Bruce Wayne, while Douglas Croft, 17, portrayed Robin and Dick Grayson.
Born:  
Jimmy Johnson, American football coach who guided the Dallas Cowboys to two Super Bowl wins; in Port Arthur, Texas 
Reinaldo Arenas, Cuban-born novelist, poet and dissident; in Aguas Claras (d. 1990)
Died:  
Saul Raphael Landau, age 79–80, Polish Jewish lawyer, journalist, publicist and Zionist activist; in New York (b. 1870)

July 17, 1943 (Saturday)

As the tank battle continued in Kursk, German panzer commanders were ordered by Adolf Hitler to withdraw from the battlefield and bring Operation Citadel to an end, despite protests by  Erich von Manstein and other German generals that the Soviet forces could be defeated.  At the time that the operation ceased, Germany had lost 252 tanks, compared to more than 2,000 lost by the Soviet Union.  The battle had 64,000 German casualties, and 320,000 of the Soviet troops.
The Allied Drive on Munda Point concluded with limited tactical gains.
Japanese forces launched the New Georgia counterattack.
The Japanese destroyer Hatsuyuki was bombed and sunk in an American air raid at Kahili, Shortland Islands.

July 18, 1943 (Sunday)
General Harold Alexander of the British Army became the first Allied Military Governor of Sicily, as conquest of the Italian island was nearly completed.  His first act was to proclaim the dissolution of all Fascist organizations.
In the only battle during World War II between an airship and a submarine, the U.S. Army blimp K-74 dropped depth charges on the German U-boat U-134, which fired its 20 mm cannons at the blimp.  The K-74 was downed and its crew of ten were rescued unharmed the next day, and nobody was hurt on the U-134 
The New Georgia counterattack ended in Japanese offensive failure.
Born: Calvin Peete, African-American professional golfer; in Detroit (d. 2015)

July 19, 1943 (Monday)
Italian dictator Benito Mussolini met with Germany's Adolf Hitler at the northern Italian town of Feltre to discuss Italy's withdrawal from further fighting, but Mussolini reportedly failed to bring the subject up. The two leaders agreed to mount a fighting withdrawal in Italy while the Gustav Line was formed across the 72 miles from the mouth of the Garigliano to the River Sangro south of Ortona.
At 11:13 in the morning, Allied airplanes dropped bombs on the ancient city of Rome, three days after the ultimatum had been made to Italy.  Italian state radio reported that 166 people were killed and 1,659 injured.  The attack, and the prospect of the conquest and destruction of Italy, would hasten the fall of Premier Mussolini.
The United States Department of War issued an order requiring that the most troublesome German prisoners of war — "Nazi leaders, Gestapo agents, and extremists" — were to be interned at the Camp Alva PW camp at Alva, Oklahoma.
The Warsaw concentration camp, referred to as KL (Konzentrationslager) Warschau was opened with barbed wire surrounding the ruins of the former Warsaw Ghetto, with a few hundred Polish prisoners and foreign Jews being put to work in destroying the remaining buildings, salvaging valuable property that may have been left in the ruins, and attempting to persuade Warsaw's remaining Jews to come out of hiding.
The German submarine U-513 was depth charged and sunk in the South Atlantic by Martin PBM Mariner aircraft of the U.S. Navy.
Born: Han Sai Por, Singaporean sculptor; in Singapore
Died: Yekaterina Budanova, 26, Soviet Air Force flying ace who shot down 20 German aircraft, was killed after her Yakovlev UT-1 plane was hit  in aerial combat.  She and fellow-Soviet Lydia Litvyak were the only two women to be recognized as "aces" for having shot down more than five aircraft.

July 20, 1943 (Tuesday)
The U.S. Joint Chiefs of Staff voted to fight Japan by invading the Gilbert Islands and Nauru first, followed by a battle for the Marshall Islands.
The Battle of Bairoko was fought between U.S. and Japanese forces on New Georgia. The day-long American assault on Japanese defensive positions was unsuccessful.
The Japanese destroyers Kiyonami and Yūgure were bombed and sunk northwest of Kolombangara by U.S. aircraft.
The German submarine U-558 was sunk in the Bay of Biscay by Allied aircraft.
Born: Wendy Richard, British TV actress (Are You Being Served? and EastEnders); in Middlesbrough (d. 2009).
Died: Walter Schilling, 47, German lieutenant general who had received the Iron Cross four times, the German Cross and the Cross of Honor for his heroism in World War One and World War Two, was killed in action in the Ukraine.

July 21, 1943 (Wednesday)
The Battle of Roosevelt Ridge began between U.S. and Japanese forces in the Salamaua region of the Territory of New Guinea.
German occupation authorities in Yugoslavia announced a bounty of 100,000 Reichsmarks for the capture of Josip Broz Tito, and the same amount for Tito's fellow resistance leader, Draža Mihailović.
The German submarine U-662 was depth charged and sunk in the Amazon Estuary by an American Consolidated PBY Catalina.
Born:  
Tess Gallagher, American poet, in Port Angeles, Washington 
Edward Herrmann, American film and TV actor, in Washington, D.C. (d. 2014)
Died: Charley Paddock, 42, American track and field athlete, winner of two gold medals in 1920 Olympics; and U.S. Army Major General William P. Upshur, 61, Medal of Honor recipient; and four others, were killed when their plane crashed during an inspection tour in Alaska.

July 22, 1943 (Thursday)
George S. Patton's Seventh United States Army entered Palermo.
The Battle of Munda Point began on New Georgia.
The Japanese seaplane tender Nisshin was bombed and sunk by American aircraft off the southeast tip of Bougainville Island. Only 178 of the 1,263 on board survived.
The remaining 2,500 Jewish prisoners at the Tarnopol concentration camp were executed by the German SS.

July 23, 1943 (Friday)
The Battle of Belgorod began on the Eastern Front.
On recommendation of the National Petroleum Council, Brazil banned the use of private motorcycles throughout the nation in order to conserve fuel.  Use of gasoline-powered automobiles had been prohibited the year before.
The British cruiser Newfoundland was torpedoed and damaged in the Mediterranean Sea by the Italian submarine Ascianghi, which was then depth charged and sunk by the British destroyers Eclipse and Laforey.
The German submarines U-527, U-598 and U-613 were lost to enemy action in the Atlantic Ocean. 
Born: Bob Hilton, American TV game show host, in Lake Charles, Louisiana

July 24, 1943 (Saturday)
Operation Gomorrah, the destruction of the German port of Hamburg began. British and Canadian airplanes bombed the city by night, and American planes followed during the day.  By the end of the operation in November, 9,000 tons of explosives would kill more than 30,000 people and destroy 280,000 buildings.  For the first time, the British forces used "Window", aluminum strips dropped to distort radar images, against the German anti-aircraft defense.
The Fascist Grand Council began its first meeting since 1939.  In a ten-hour session that lasted into the next morning, the Council criticized Prime Minister Mussolini for his failure to prevent Italy from being invaded.  At the end of the meeting, on a motion by Dino Grandi the Council voted 19 to 7 to remove Mussolini from further leadership.
The German submarines U-459 and U-622 were lost to enemy action.

July 25, 1943 (Sunday)
Benito Mussolini resigned as Prime Minister of Italy, along with the other Fascist Party members of his cabinet, bringing an end to a dictatorship of more than 17 years. After leaving the meeting of the Fascist Grand Council earlier that day, Mussolini reportedly left to award prizes in a farmer's festival to conduct business as usual.  Count Grandi then reported the Fascist Council decision to King Victor Emmanuel III, who ordered Mussolini to report personally, and then asked the longtime Premier to resign.  When Mussolini asked for more time and left the palace, he was arrested, then driven away to face imprisonment.  Marshal Pietro Badoglio was appointed by King Victor Emmanuel III as the new Italian premier.   
The USS Harmon, the first U.S. Navy ship to be named after an African-American person, was launched.  The ship was named for Leonard Roy Harmon, a mess attendant who had been killed in Guadalcanal while saving a shipmate.<ref>"Blacks in the War", The Logistics of War: A Historical Perspective", Beth F. Scott, et al., eds (Air Force Logistics Management Agency, 2000) p264</ref> 
Ubaldo Pugnaloni won the Giro d'Italia, the national cycling championship of Italy, on the day that the Fascist government was overthrown.

July 26, 1943 (Monday)
American-born poet Ezra Pound was indicted for treason for making radio broadcasts from Italy for the Axis powers; indicted also were Robert H. Best, Fred W. Kaltenbach, Douglas Chandler ("Paul Revere"), Edward Delaney (E.D. Ward), Constance Drexel, Jane Anderson, and Max Otto Koischwitz ("O.K.").  U. S. Attorney General Francis Biddle said that any of the eight, all indicted in absentia, would be brought to trial when caught.
An assassination attempt was made on Mohammed Ali Jinnah, the future leader of Pakistan.  Jinnah was in his home in Bombay (Mumbai) when a young man attacked him with a knife, but he escaped major wounds. 
The German submarine U-359 was depth charged and sunk off the southwest tip of Haiti by an American Martin PBM Mariner aircraft.
Born: Mick Jagger, English rock singer (The Rolling Stones), as Michael Philip Jagger in Dartford

July 27, 1943 (Tuesday)
Major Joseph Duckworth and his navigator, Lieutenant Ralph O'Hair, both of the United States Army, became the first persons to deliberately fly an airplane into the eye of a hurricane.  Duckworth piloted an AT-6 airplane to gather data on the storm near Houston, although according to a 1955 book by Ivan Tannehill, The Hurricane Hunters, "several of Duckworth's instructors had flown in into the same storm in B-25s, but were afraid of their boss."  Storm warnings were not given for what would be called the "Surprise Hurricane", because of censorship during World War II.  Although its winds had declined to what is now called a tropical storm, 19 people were killed and there was 17 million dollars of damage (equivalent to $225,000,000 in 2013).  "After the loss of life in this storm", meteorologist Bryan Norcross would write later, weather information has never been censored again."  
Prince Aimone, Duke of Aosta, a member of the royal family of Italy who had been  named by Benito Mussolini as King Tomislav II of the "Independent State of Croatia", renounced his rights to the throne without ever having set foot in his kingdom.  When he was the Duke of Spoleto, Aimone was selected as the figurehead monarch of the puppet state, which had been set up in Axis-occupied Yugoslavia.  Ante Pavelić, who ruled Croatia as its Prime Minister, accepted the King's abdication and then turned the state into a republic.
Government broadcasts from Rome announced that Marshal Badoglio and his new cabinet had ordered the dissolution of the Fascist Council, and that the Fascist Party would be abolished.
The Japanese submarine I-168 was torpedoed and sunk in the Steffen Strait by the American submarine Scamp.

July 28, 1943 (Wednesday)
In the greatest single-day loss of life in wartime, up to then, more than 30,000 residents of the German port city of Hamburg were killed when British bombers carried out Operation Gomorrha during the night of July 27 and 28th.  Because of unusually dry conditions, the high combustibility of buildings in the working class neighborhoods of Billwärder-Ausschlag, Borgfelde and Hamm, and the use of more than 1,000 tons of incendiary bombs, a firestorm was created, bringing powerful winds to spread the destruction.  Most of the victims died from carbon monoxide poisoning inside basement shelters, and it took two days for the streets to cool down enough for rescue teams to look for survivors.  "At the heart of the apocalyptic fire", author Frederick Taylor would write later, "there were no survivors found, none at all."
American Airlines Flight 63, from Louisville to Nashville, crashed near the town of Trammell, Kentucky, killing the twenty people on board.
U.S. Army General Dwight D. Eisenhower, the Supreme Commander of Allied Forces, made a radio broadcast to Italy, urging the Italian people to follow up the overthrow of Mussolini by withdrawing from the Axis powers.  "You can have peace immediately, and peace under the honorable conditions which our governments have already offered you," said Eisenhower.  "We are coming to you as liberators ... As you have already seen in Sicily, our occupation will be mild and beneficient ... The ancient liberties and traditions of your country will be restored."
President Roosevelt gave a fireside chat on the fall of Mussolini. Roosevelt vowed that the fallen dictator "and his Fascist gang will be brought to book, and punished for their crimes against humanity. No criminal will be allowed to escape by the expedient of 'resignation.' So our terms to Italy are still the same as our terms to Germany and Japan --'unconditional surrender.'"
At the Old Bailey in London, Communist Party member Douglas Springhall was sentenced to seven years in prison for obtaining information about munitions "calculated to be useful to the enemy." Justice Oliver told Springhall, "I do not think, on your record, it is likely that your purpose was to communicate these things to Germany, but to communicate them to someone I have no doubt whatever." 
The Japanese destroyers Ariake and Mikazuki were bombed and sunk off Cape Gloucester, New Guinea by American B-25 Mitchell aircraft.
The German submarines U-159 and U-404 were lost to enemy action.
IKEA, now the world's largest retailer of furniture, was founded in Sweden by a 17-year old carpenter, Ingvar Kamprad, with the concept of selling items at a lower price, for the purchaser to assemble. Kamprad coined the name from his initials, and his address of the Eimtaryd farm near the village of Älmtaryd.
Born:  
Bill Bradley, Hall of Fame basketball player and politician, in Crystal City, Missouri 
Richard Wright, British musician (Pink Floyd), in Harrow, London (d. 2008) 
Mike Bloomfield, American composer and guitarist, in Chicago (d. 1981)

July 29, 1943 (Thursday)
The Alaskan island of Kiska was evacuated by the remaining 5,183 Japanese officers, enlisted men and civilians who had occupied the American territory.  U.S. ships had been diverted away from the island between July 23rd and 26th, when American radar detected what appeared to be a convoy of seven reinforcement ships.  With the U.S. warships away from Kiska, the Japanese escaped to their own rescue ships within 55 minutes.  When Allied troops arrived on August 15, they were surprised to find that the island was deserted.
The British government announced that women under the age of 50 must register for war work.
The Italian submarine Pietro Micca was sunk at the entrance to the Adriatic Sea by the British submarine Trooper.
The German submarine U-614 was depth charged and sunk northwest of Cape Finisterre by a Vickers Wellington of No. 172 Squadron RAF.

July 30, 1943 (Friday)
The world's first jet-powered bomber airplane, the German Arado Ar 234, made its first flight. 
France renounced the concession that it had held to Chinese territory in Shanghai since 1849. 
Igor Kurchatov, the Soviet physicist assigned to developing the first nuclear bomb for the U.S.S.R., reported to Deputy Premier Vyacheslav Molotov that the program had advanced significantly from secrets gathered in espionage against the United States.
Six German submarines (U-43, U-375, U-461, U-462, U-504 and U-591) were all lost to enemy action on the same day.
Died: Marie-Louise Giraud, 39, a French housewife who had been convicted of carrying out 27 abortions, became the last woman in France to be executed by guillotine, with her sentence carried out by the Nazi occupation government.

July 31, 1943 (Saturday)
The Battle of Troina began on the island of Sicily.
The Brazilian passenger ship and freighter Bage, largest commercial ship in Brazil's fleet, was torpedoed and sunk off the coast of the Sergipe state.  The Bage was carrying 129 passengers and 102 crew, and was en route from Belem to Rio de Janeiro when it was struck by a German U-boat.  Seventy-eight people (41 passengers and 37 crew) did not survive the voyage.
The five-month Allied strategic bombing campaign known as the Battle of the Ruhr ended in Allied victory.
General Henri Giraud was designated as commander-in-chief of the French Resistance forces, as the new National Committee of Liberation held its first meeting, establishing a government in French Algeria.  General Charles de Gaulle was named as President of the Committee.
The German submarine U-199 was depth charged and sunk in the South Atlantic by American aircraft.
"You'll Never Know" by Dick Haymes hit #1 on the Billboard'' singles chart.
Born: William Bennett, American politician, conservative pundit and political theorist; in Brooklyn, New York City

References

1943
1943-07
1943-07